Plastic Jesus may refer to:
Plastic Jesus (song), an American folk song written by George Cromarty and Ed Rush
Plastic Jesus (novella), by Poppy Z. Brite
Plastic Jesus (artist), anonymous artist based in Los Angeles, California
Plastic Jesus, a 1971 film by Lazar Stojanović
Plastic Jesus, a novel by Robert Miskimon